The Underwater Hockey World Championship is the peak international event for the underwater sport of Underwater Hockey.  The event is conducted on behalf of the Confédération Mondiale des Activités Subaquatiques (CMAS) by an affiliated national federation.

History
The championship was first held in 1980 in Vancouver, British Columbia, Canada after the intended initial championship scheduled for 1979 was beset by difficulties and ultimately postponed, due to the invitation of a team from South Africa and the problems associated with apartheid.

Subsequently, a world championship has been held every two years in locations around the world up until 2006. 2006 saw many CMAS-affiliated national federations as well as the majority of the CMAS Underwater Hockey Commission members in dispute with CMAS over policy and governance matters concerning underwater hockey. Out of the divide the World Aquachallenge Association (WAA) - an alternative governing body - was born.

In 2007 CMAS intended to incorporate the Underwater Hockey World Championship into its inaugural World Games event in Bari, Italy, an ambitious event intended to showcase all of the underwater disciplines (Underwater Rugby, Finswimming etc) governed by them in one place. As far as underwater hockey goes this event was poorly attended, in part due to it being 'out of synch' with many affiliated federations' training calendars and budgets. The following year - the 'normal' world championship year - the WAA organised their 'rival' 1st World Championship event in Durban, South Africa. This is now held by many to have been the official 2008 World Championship despite it being poorly attended too, in part this time because CMAS organised a major underwater hockey 'zone' event to be held in Istanbul, Turkey on exactly the same dates meaning a majority of European federations were forced to choose which championship their representative teams attended.

The WAA was short-lived and since 2008 CMAS has once again administered all the world championship events in various age/gender divisions with the most recent having been held in Quebec City, Canada in 2018. World championships in the different age categories are now scheduled for every second year.

Editions Summary

Championships conducted by CMAS

Source:

Senior

Junior

Championships conducted by WAA
The 1st WAA World Championships is considered by some as being the legitimate 15th Championships.

Results by Nation

See also
 Underwater Hockey European Championships
 Underwater hockey at the 2019 Southeast Asian Games

Notes

References

External links
CMAS Championship Archive
WAA World Championship Results

Underwater hockey
Underwater
Recurring sporting events established in 1980